Rolleston is a rural town and locality in the Central Highlands Region, Queensland, Australia.

Geography 
Rolleston is at the junction of the Carnarvon, Gregory and Dawson highways.

History 
Rolleston was built on Kanolu land.

Wadja (also known as Wadjigu, Wadia, Wadjainngo, Mandalgu, and Wadjigun) is an Australian Aboriginal language in Central Queensland. The language region includes  the local government areas of the Aboriginal Shire of Woorabinda and Central Highlands Region, including the Blackdown Tablelands. the Comet River, and the Expedition Range, and the towns of Woorabinda, Springsure and Rolleston.

The town is named after Christopher Rolleston, a pastoralist who was involved in leasing a number of pastoral runs in the area in the 1860s.

Rolleston State School opened on 9 October 1871.

Queensland's last legendary cattle thieves and bushrangers, the notorious Patrick and James Kenniff, frequently lived at Lethbridge Pocket, which is now within Carnarvon National Park. It was here on Easter Sunday, 30 March 1902, that they murdered Constable George Doyle and cattle station manager Albert Dahlke.

All Saints Anglican Church was officially opened on Sunday 10 June 1934 by Bishop Fortescue Ash.

Mining began at the Rollestone coal mine in October 2005 and is expected to last more than 20 years.

Education 

Rolleston State School is a government primary (Prep-6) school for boys and girls at 16 Warrijo Street. In 2018, the school had an enrolment of 63 students with 6 teachers (4 full-time equivalent) and 7 non-teaching staff (3 full-time equivalent).

There are no secondary schools in Rolleston or nearby. The nearest government schools offering secondary education are Springsure State School (to Year 10) in Springsure to the north-west and Emerald State High School (to Year 12) in Emerald to the north. Distance education and boarding schools are options.

Facilities 
Emergency services available in Rolleston include:

 Rolleston Police Station
 Rolleston Fire Station
 Rolleston SES Facility

Amenities 
The Central Highlands Regional Council operates a public library on Planet Street.

There are two churches in Rolleston:

 All Saints' Anglican Church, 2 Warrijo Street
 St Theresa's Catholic Church, 28 Orion Street

See also

 Expedition Range
 Lake Nuga Nuga

References

External links

 Rolleston weather records
 Queensland travel site

Mining towns in Queensland
Towns in Queensland
Central Highlands Region
Localities in Queensland